Thryssocypris tonlesapensis is a species of cyprinid of the genus Thryssocypris, described in 1984. It has a maximum length of  among unsexed males and is endemic to the Mekong basin, inhabiting Cambodia and Laos. It has 9-10 dorsal soft rays, 15-16 anal soft rays and 43-44 vertebrae. It is considered harmless to humans and is classified as "least concern" on the IUCN Red List.

References

Cyprinid fish of Asia
IUCN Red List least concern species
Fish of Cambodia
Fish of Laos